The Bear Wallow Wilderness is an  wilderness area in eastern Arizona in the United States. The wilderness, located in the Apache National Forest, is managed by the U.S. Forest Service. The area has been severely affected by the Wallow Fire of June 2011 which originated here. Bear Wallow Creek provides a habitat for the endemic and threatened Apache trout.

See also
 Wilderness Act
 List of U.S. Wilderness Areas
 List of Arizona Wilderness Areas

References

Wilderness areas of Arizona
Protected areas of Greenlee County, Arizona
Apache-Sitgreaves National Forests
Protected areas established in 1984
1984 establishments in Arizona